Lei Wenjie (born 2 January 1997) is a Chinese footballer who currently plays for Nantong Zhiyun, on loan from Shanghai SIPG in the Chinese Super League.

Club career
Lei Wenjie joined Chinese Super League side Shanghai SIPG's youth academy in November 2014 when Shanghai SIPG bought Shanghai Luckystar's youth team. He was promoted to the first team squad by André Villas-Boas in the 2017 season. On 17 July 2018, Lei made his senior debut in a 1–1 away draw against Shandong Luneng Taishan, coming on as a substitute for Wu Lei in the 88th minute. He scored his first senior goal in his second appearance on 28 July 2018, in a 5–1 away win over Beijing Renhe.

On 28 July 2021, Lei would be loaned out to second tier club Nantong Zhiyun and would go on to make his debut in a league game on 31 July 2021 against Heilongjiang Ice City in a 0-0 draw. The following season he would be loaned out to Nantong again and would go on to establish himself within the team and helped the club gain promotion to the top tier at the end of the 2022 China League One season.

Career statistics
.

Honours

Club
Shanghai SIPG
Chinese Super League: 2018
Chinese FA Super Cup: 2019

References

External links
 

1997 births
Living people
Chinese footballers
Footballers from Jiangxi
People from Nanchang
Shanghai Port F.C. players
Chinese Super League players
Association football midfielders